Breweries in Minnesota produce a wide range of beers in different styles that are marketed locally, regionally, and nationally in the United States.  Brewing companies vary widely in the volume and variety of beer produced, from small nanobreweries and microbreweries to massive multinational conglomerate macrobreweries.

In 2014, Minnesota's 109 brewing establishments (including breweries, brewpubs, importers, and company-owned packagers and wholesalers) employed 667 people directly, and more than 24,000 others in related jobs such as wholesaling and retailing. As of 2020, the number of craft breweries had grown to 217, and the craft brewing overall economic impact of $2.2 billion ranked 12th among U.S. states.

Including people directly employed in brewing, as well as those who supply Minnesota's breweries with everything from ingredients to machinery, the total business and personal tax revenue generated by Minnesota's breweries and related industries was more than $480 million. Consumer purchases of Minnesota's brewery products generated more than $177 million extra in tax revenue. In 2020, Minnesota ranked 13th among U.S. states in the number of craft breweries per capita, with 5.2 breweries per 100,000 adults.

Breweries

To be included in this list, a brewery must be located in the U.S. state of Minnesota; it may produce their own beer, produce contract beers, or both. Breweries which are known to produce contract beer are noted, but this specification does not exclude non-contract brewing, nor does a lack of this specification exclude contract brewing.

See also 
 Beer in the United States
 List of breweries in the United States
 List of microbreweries

References

Minnesota
Lists of companies based in Minnesota
Breweries